is a short story by the Japanese author Jun'ichirō Tanizaki, first published in 1926.

Plot
Yurako is an actress whose husband, Nakada, now dead, was a film director.  After Nakada's death, she finds his testamentary diary, which reveals a fact that Nakada believes to be the direct cause of his eventual death.  The diary explains that he told no one what happened to him.

Long ago, Nakada was dining at a restaurant when he met a middle-aged man who had seen all the films that Yurako had been in.  The man boasted that he had a thorough knowledge of Yurako's body and claimed that Yurako belonged not only to Nakada, but also to him.  The man even claimed that he had his own "Yurako" in his house and invited Nakada over to see her. Though he was disturbed by the story, Nakada gave in to his curiosity and accepted the invitation.  At the man's house, Nakada saw a large number of dolls that were all perfect copies of Yurako.

References

Books by Junichiro Tanizaki